Osceola County is the name of three counties in the United States:

 Osceola County, Florida 
 Osceola County, Iowa 
 Osceola County, Michigan